Ana Otero (born December 28, 1984) is a Portuguese-American professional wrestler and manager known by her ring name "The Portuguese Princess" Ariel, who has competed in Northeastern independent promotions including Ring of Honor, IWA Mid-South and the National Wrestling Alliance.

Career

Early life and career
Born in São Miguel, Azores, Ana immigrated with her family to the United States in 1996, settling in New Bedford, Massachusetts. An avid wrestling fan during the late 1990s, she and her brother began training for a career in professional wrestling at the Top Rope Academy, studying under Brickhouse Baker, Scott Ashworth, and José Pérez. In January 2001, she and her brother began training at Yankee Pro Wrestling's wrestling school in Sunshine Plaza. Several months later, while still only a junior in New Bedford High School, Rocha made her professional debut in South Coast Championship Wrestling on May 12, 2001.

Originally appearing as a valet for "Heavenly" Johnny Angel, she was attacked by his opponent Adam Booker during their match on May 12, 2001, this being her first appearance in the promotion. After several weeks, during which time Johnny Angel had become the SCCW Heavyweight Champion, she would team with him in a mixed tag team match against Adam Booker and former champion Dr. Heresy, in which Booker pinned Ariel to win the title. The following night, she herself eventually made her own wrestling debut defeating Amanda Storm on July 21, and, although she sustained slight injury during the match, she soon began regularly competing on the independent circuit teaming with such wrestlers as The Blue Meanie, defeating Steve Corino and Gino Giovanni. By the end of the year, she had defeated The Crazy Mexican for the Women's Heavyweight title in Stars & Stripes Championship Wrestling on December 29, 2001.

Independent circuit
During the next two years, she won championship titles in numerous promotions, including winning a battle royal to become JWA Women's champion on October 26, 2002 and defeating Alicia and Tara Charisma in a three-way match to become the first Women's Champion for South Coast Championship Wrestling on March 28, 2003. Shortly after this victory, she started making appearances for Ring of Honor as a manager of the Christopher Street Connection (Buff E and Mace), a role which she held until the summer of 2004 when the trio was released from the company.

Briefly feuding with Mercedes Martínez and the heel stable La Família in Connecticut Championship Wrestling in late 2003, she competed in a number of east coast promotions throughout the next year including Jersey All Pro Wrestling, USA Pro, and UWA, where she and Talia defeated Ref Hanson and Lady Lee to win the UWA Tag Team titles on July 18, 2004.

In 2004 Rocha, under a mask and the ring name Arianna, made her debut for Mexican promotion Lucha Libre Femenil, where she feuded with Nikki Roxx over the LLF Juvenil Championship. On October 28, 2004, Roxx defeated Arianna in a hair vs. mask match to claim her opponent's mask and end the feud.

Appearing at "CyberCade 2004" for the CyberSpace Wrestling Federation, she lost to April Hunter in a four-way match with Trinity and Traci Brooks in a match for the CWF Women's Championship in Wayne, New Jersey on August 28, 2004. Having faced both in previous singles matches, Rocha teamed with rival Mercedes Martínez to defeat April Hunter and Sumie Sakai in a tag team match for Defiant Pro Wrestling at the Veterans Memorial Auditorium in Fall River, Massachusetts on August 29, 2004. The event, "A Fight Worth Fighting", was to raise funds to provide treatment for children with cancer, and which featured Mick Foley and several leading independent wrestlers in the New England area.

In late 2004, she entered a mild losing streak after being defeated by Cindy Rogers at the Connecticut Championship Wrestling supercard CCW Metamorphosis on September 26.  During this encounter, Cindy Rogers was wearing spandex tights.  Later that year, she  lost a three-way match with Hailey Skye and Violet Flame for New England Championship Wrestling on December 11, 2004.

Assault Championship Wrestling (2005)
Throughout the year, appearing in several events for Assault Championship Wrestling, Rocha became involved in a three-way feud with Mercedes Martinez and April Hunter which later involved Riptide who defeated all three in a "Battle of the Babes" match at the DPW supercard Full Circle: Zero Tolerance. Rocha, Martinez and Riptide united against the Ultimate Males, defeating them at an intergender match at the supercard November Pain: Balance of Power; following their victory however, the feud resumed after Rocha was attacked by both Martinez and Riptide. Rocha rebounded by defeating Martinez and Riptide in tag team matches with Jim Nastic and Trinity although she later lost a three-way match with Martinez against Riptide at the supercard Chains Unbound and was defeated in a singles match by Martinez at the supercard Evil Intent: Blood For Blood.

Although Rocha found some success teaming with Abunai at the supercard Psychotic Breakdown to defeat Nikki Roxx and D.C. Dillinger in a mixed tag team match, she eventually turned on Spider after briefly joining her in her feud against La Familia.

IWA Mid-South (2005)
At NECW Snowbrawl, Rocha Won the IWA Mid-South Women's Championship after defeating longtime rivals Mercedes Martinez and Hayley Skye in a Triple Threat match  on January 15, 2005. Traveling to IWA Mid-South, she began defending her title in IWA Mid-South before being defeated by Daizee Haze in a match with Cheerleader Melissa, Mickie Knuckles, Sara Del Rey and MsChif on February 12, 2005.

During the next year, she scored victories over Lacey, Hailey Hatred and April Hunter defeating her at Ballpark Brawl IV on April 15, 2005. However, she was less successful teaming with Demonica while in the PWF and later resulting a feud between the two with Rocha defeating her former tag team partner on September 15. The following month, after defeating Rain at an event for Shimmer Women Athletes, she was later defeated by Cheerleader Melissa and Tiana Ringer in a tag team match with Shantelle Taylor on November 6, 2005.

Return to New England (2006-2010)

In 2006, Rocha began competing for the National Wrestling Alliance (NWA) returning to the New England area wrestling for NWA Cyberspace as well as making regular appearances in Connecticut Championship Wrestling and New England Championship Wrestling (NECW) defending the PWF Mayhem Women's title as well as feuding with Mercedes Martinez and Nikki Roxx. In 2008, she turned heel in NECW/WWW, hiring Brendan Michael Thomas as her "agent".

While in Shimmer Women Athletes, she faced Lexie Fyfe and Malia Hosaka tag team matches with Josie and later with Cindy Rogers in a 6-Woman tag team match against Fyfe, Hosaka and Amazing Kong in May 2006. After missing Volume 23 she came back as part of the Volume 24 in a Tag Team Match with Nikki Roxx losing to The International Home Wrecking Crew. On May 3 she took part in a Fatal 4-Way match along with Cat Power, Rachel Summerlyn and Kellie Skater which was eventually won by Cat Power. Later in the night she teamed once again with Nikki Roxx and scored a pinfall against The Experience. As part of Volume 27 she lost a re-match to Cat Power, but she was able to score a pinfall over Malia Hosaka as part of Volume 28's opening match.

On April 10, 2010 Ariel teamed up with Nikki Roxx to defeat the team of Melanie Cruise and Annie Social.

Jersey All Pro Wrestling (2009)
Ariel debuted for Jersey All Pro Wrestling at Female Revolution in January 2009, but was defeated by Raisha Saeed. After missing the second show A Queen is Crowned, she returned in a loss to Allison Danger. She got her first win over Fate at the fourth show Back Where it all Began. They are now scheduled for a rematch on the fifth show.

NCW Femmes Fatales (2010)
Ariel will make her Canadian debut for NCW Femmes Fatales on February 6 against Kalamity who won the opportunity to face Ariel in a Fatal 4 Way Elimination Match on the first show also involving Mary Lee Rose, Roxxie Cotton and Anna Minouska.

Return to the Ring (2015)
After taking a hiatus from wrestling since October 2011, Ariel returned to the ring on October 17, 2015, for Revival Pro Wrestling event in Palmer, Massachusetts. She teamed with BMT in a tag team match against Natalia and Anthony Stone.

Personal life 
Ariel married former wrestler Tomas Otero (Brendan Michael Thomas) in October 2011. In May 2012, she was expecting twin girls. By 2018, she had become a mother of five children.

Championships and accomplishments
Ace Wrestling
AW Women's Championship (1 time)
Border City Wrestling
BCW Women's Championship (1 time)
Defiant Divas Wrestling
DDW Women's championship (2 times)
Defiant Pro Wrestling
DPW Women's Championship (1 time, current)
GLORY Wrestling
Glory Women's Championship (1 time)
JWA-United Wrestling
JWA Women's Championship (1 time)
NWA Midwest / Independent Wrestling Association Mid-South
NWA Midwest/IWA Mid-South Women's Championship (1 time)
NWA North Jersey
NWA North Jersey Women's Championship (1 time)
NWA North Jersey Women's Tag Team Championship (1 time) - with Tara Charisma
New England Championship Wrestling
World Women's Wrestling Championship (1 time)
Pennsylvania Championship Wrestling
PCW Women's Championship (1 time)
Premier Wrestling Federation
PWF Mayhem Women's Championship (1 time)
South Coast Championship Wrestling
SCCW Women's Championship (1 time)
Stars and Stripes Championship Wrestling
SSCW Women's Championship (1 time)
Universal Wrestling Association
UWA Women's Tag Team Championship (1 time) – with Talia

Lucha de Apuesta record

References

External links

ArielsPalace.com - Official Website
G.L.O.R.Y. Biography
Independent Profile: Ariel
Ariel on Online World of Wrestling
Profile: Ana Rocha
CageMatch.de - Ariel 

1984 births
Living people
Portuguese emigrants to the United States
Sportspeople from Boston
American female professional wrestlers
21st-century American women
21st-century professional wrestlers
Portuguese female professional wrestlers